Amber Ferreira (née Cullen; born 1982) is an American triathlete, coach and endurance athlete. She is the 2010 and 2014 United States Snowshoe Champion and the 2012 World Snowshoe Championship runner-up.

Athletic career
Ferreira was born to Gregory and Gloria Cullen, and grew up in Westford, Massachusetts, where she attended Westford Academy. She was recruited to run track and cross country and attended Northeastern University where she held the 10K school record. After college, she married Danny Ferreira and began branching out from the standard 5 and 10k distances that she had competed in college. She competed in 24-hour road races, endurance cross-country ski races, trail marathons and 10 mile swims. After about three years of trialing various sports, she settled on triathlons and began her career as a professional triathlete. In 2014, she won Ironman Lake Placid and finished 2nd at Ironman Mont Tremblant and Ironman Texas.

In addition to competing at the international level in long-distance triathlons, Ferreira also competes in snowshoe and road running competitions as well as coaches endurance athletes herself.

Notable results

Triathlon

Other results and recognitions
2016 Killington Stage Race (Pro-3)-2nd
2016 Crossan Cup Winner 
2015 Laugavegur Ultra Marathon - 1st
2014 US Snowshoe Champion
2012 World Snowshoe Championships - 2nd
2011 Mount Washington Road Race - 10th
2010 US Snowshoe Champion
2010 Granite State Snowshoe Series - 1st
2010 Mount Washington Road Race - 7th
2010 US Snowshoe Champion
2010 and 2009 NH Triathlete of the Year
2010 and 2009 USAT All-American
2010 Crossan Cup Winner
2009 Lord of the Flies Triathlon challenge - 1st
2009 Bull Moose Champion
2008 New Hampshire Best of the U.S. Amateur Triathlon
2009 New Orleans Mardi Gras Marathon - 9th Place

References

External links 

American female triathletes
Living people
People from Westford, Massachusetts
Sportspeople from Middlesex County, Massachusetts
Northeastern Huskies women's cross country runners
Northeastern Huskies women's track and field athletes
American snowshoers
1982 births
Snowshoe runners